Caridina semiblepsia is a cave dwelling freshwater shrimp from China. It is only known from one location: the Baojing Cave in the province of Hunan.

References

Atyidae
Freshwater crustaceans of Asia
Crustaceans described in 1996